The Botswana Council of Churches (BCC) is an ecumenical Christian organization in Botswana. It was founded in 1966 and is a member of the World Council of Churches and the Fellowship of Christian Councils in Southern Africa.

Members
Anglican Diocese of Botswana
Church of God in Christ
Dutch Reformed Church in Botswana
Evangelical Lutheran Church in Botswana
Evangelical Lutheran Church in Southern Africa
Lamb's Followers Apostles Church
Methodist Church of Southern Africa
Revelation Blessed Peace Church
Roman Catholic Church
St Apostolic Church in Botswana
St Isaac Church in Salvation
St Paul's Apostolic Mission
United Congregational Church of Southern Africa
Utlwang Lefoko Apostolic Church

Associate Members
Association of Medical Missions in Botswana
Bible Society in Botswana
Christian Women's Fellowship
Jesus Generation Movement
Kgolagano College of Theological Education
Mennonite Ministries in Botswana
Young Women's Christian Association

External links  
World Council of Churches listing
BCC celebrates 50 years from Mmegi Online (2016)

Christian organizations established in 1966
Members of the World Council of Churches
Christian organizations based in Africa
Christianity in Botswana
National councils of churches